William Gunter (died 28 August 1588) was a Roman Catholic priest who was martyred under Queen Elizabeth I during the aftermath of the Spanish Armada, and is one of the One Hundred and Seven Martyrs of England and Wales. 

He was beatified in 1929 by Pope Pius XI.

History 
William Gunter was from Raglan in Monmouthshire. He studied in Reims, France, where he was ordained in 1587.

He was martyred in Lincoln's Inn Fields on 28 August 1588 under the persecutions of Queen Elizabeth I.

See also 
 List of Catholic martyrs of the English Reformation

References 

1588 deaths
People executed under Elizabeth I
People from Monmouthshire
16th-century Welsh Roman Catholic priests
Beatified people
One Hundred and Seven Martyrs of England and Wales